Emiliano "Poty" Sanchez (born 9 December 1977 in Buenos Aires) is an Argentine speedway rider, with Italian ancestry. He is three times National Argentinian champion and twice National Italian champion. He has raced internationally for Italy.

Club career
Sanchez started his British racing career with Glasgow Tigers in 1999. He quickly impressed and spent a further two seasons with the Scottish club before moving to England where he rode for Cornish side, Trelawny Tigers. He was part of their side that won the Premier Trophy in 2002. After moving to Hull Vikings he was part of the side that won the league and cup double in his first season in 2004.

When Hull folded after the 2005 season, his contract was bought by Sheffield Tigers and he rode for the Yorkshire outfit in 2006. In 2007 he joined the newly reformed Birmingham Brummies, who ride at the Perry Barr Greyhound racing track, on loan from Sheffield Tigers. However, he had to have his spleen removed after rupturing it in a track crash. It ended his season and for a time there was uncertainty over his ability to start the 2008 season. In the end he made a full recovery and signed for Stoke Potters. 

His confidence around their home track at the Loomer Road Stadium suffered and in early June he moved to Scunthorpe Scorpions. 
In 2009 Sanchez was signed by the Kings Lynn Stars after the Stars learned that John Oliver would not be returning to the UK from Australia for the 2009 season.  Sanchez proved an inspired signing, helping the Stars secure the Premier League Championship and Premier Trophy.

Individual career
Sanchez was the Argentine National Championship in 2000, 2002 and 2012. He also won the Italian National title in 2004 & 2005.

International career
Sanchez has represented Italy at the Speedway World Cup three times. In the 2003 Speedway World Cup Italy finished 4th out of five teams in the first qualifying round in Daugavpils, Latvia. Sanchez scored twelve points. In the 2004 he led the Italians with 12 points in the first qualifying round held at Lonigo in Italy, as they finished in first place and qualified for the semi-finals. Italy finished last in the second semi-final held at Eastbourne, England, with Sanchez again topping the Italians scoring with six points.

Sanchez rode again for Italy in the 2005 Speedway World Cup when they finished last in the second qualifying round held at Terenzano in Italy. Sanchez again led the Italians with six points. He also rode for Italy in the 2005 European Pairs Speedway Championship final held in Gdańsk with the Italians finishing sixth out of seven teams and Sanchez scored six points.

Honours
Club
Trelawny Tigers
Premier Trophy winner: (1) 2002
Hull Vikings
Premier League champion: (1) 2004
Premier Trophy winner: (1) 2004
Premier League Fours winner: (1) 2004
Young Shield winner: (1) 2004
Rider of the Year: (1) 2004

References

1977 births
Living people
Italian speedway riders
Argentine speedway riders
Sportspeople from Buenos Aires
Argentine expatriate sportspeople in Italy
Glasgow Tigers riders
Birmingham Brummies riders
Newcastle Diamonds riders
Sheffield Tigers riders
Stoke Potters riders
Scunthorpe Scorpions riders
Argentine expatriate sportspeople in England